Mseto Sports is a Tanzanian football club based in Morogoro in east Tanzania. It is one of the three biggest football clubs in Morogoro.

In 1975 Mseto Sports won the Tanzanian Premier League.

Honours
Tanzanian Premier League: 1
1975

See also
Tanzanian Premier League

References

External links
Foot-Base

Football clubs in Tanzania
Sport in Dar es Salaam